Events from the year 1763 in Denmark.

Incumbents
 Monarch – Frederick V
 Prime minister – Johan Ludvig Holstein-Ledreborg (until 29 January), Count Johann Hartwig Ernst von Bernstorff

Events

Births
 16 February – Julie Reventlow, countess, writer and salonist (died 1816) 
 18 March — Marie Christine Björn, ballet dancer (died 1837)
 17 August – Peter Schousboe, botanist (died 1832)

Deaths
 29 January – Johan Ludvig Holstein, statesman (born 1694)
 4 March – Johan Hörner, painter (born 1711)
 25 May – Frederik Christian von Haven, philologist, theologian and patron of the arts (born 1728)
 1 December – Jacob Fosie, painter (born 1679)
 3 December  – Carl August Thielo, composer. theatre entrepreneur, music teacher, organist (born 1702)

References

 
1760s in Denmark
Denmark
Years of the 18th century in Denmark